The Turkestan rat (Rattus pyctoris) is a species of rodent in the family Muridae.

Distribution and habitat
The species is found throughout continental Asia from Afghanistan to China, at altitudes from 1,200 to 4,250 m. It occurs in montane areas, rocky habitats and frequently near or on cultivated or residential land.

References

Rattus
Rats of Asia
Mammals of Afghanistan
Mammals of Pakistan
Mammals of Nepal
Rodents of China
Mammals described in 1845
Taxonomy articles created by Polbot